FX Photo Studio is a digital photography application for the Apple iPhone. It is compatible with iPhone, iPod Touch, and iPad, requires iOS 4.3 or later.

Product backstory
FX Photo Studio 1.0 was developed in 2009 for the original iPhone and received recognition among the smartphone users. Now it is regularly updated. In 2011 a version for Mac was released. In 2011 BestAppEver portal named FX Photo Studio the 
best photo editing app of the year.

Features
FX Photo Studio uses the iPhone's camera to allow the user shoot photographs, download them from camera roll or iTunes, crop, flip and rotate, apply 194 effects and filters that make photos look like they were taken with a film camera or like sketches, pop-art or else. Users are allowed to mix and customize effects, paint with them, save combinations and share them. It is possible to edit gamma, hue and saturation, contrast and exposure. There is an extra feature of Selective color photography. The maximum resolution for photos can be set ranging from 320 to 2592.
In Options menu users can configure the maximum resolution, quality, hidden effects, online help, shake to apply a random effect, auto rotate image, add location info to the picture.

The main effects are:
Lomo
Black & White
Sketch
Grunge
Vintage
Art
3D
Textures
Color Strokes
Overlays
etc.

Sharing
Users are allowed to share pictures through Instagram, Facebook, Twitter, Flickr, Tumblr, send them using e-mail and order pictures to be sent as postcards around the world.

References

Photo software
IOS software